Costa Rica competed at the 1984 Winter Olympics in Sarajevo, Yugoslavia.

Alpine skiing

Men

Biathlon

Men

 1 A penalty loop of 150 metres had to be skied per missed target.
 2 One minute added per missed target.

Cross-country skiing

Men

References
Official Olympic Reports
 Olympic Winter Games 1984, full results by sports-reference.com

Nations at the 1984 Winter Olympics
1984 Winter Olympics
1984 in Costa Rican sport